Jonathan Andrew Rutherford (born 13 July 1956)  is an academic who was formerly a Professor of Cultural Studies at Middlesex University. Within British politics Rutherford is associated with the Blue Labour school of thought within the Labour Party, and has been described as one of its "leading thinkers". He was the editor of Soundings from 2004 to 2012.

References

1956 births
Academics of Middlesex University
Blue Labour
British political scientists
Living people